Blavia is a genus of moths in the subfamily Arctiinae. The genus was erected by Francis Walker in 1862.

Species
Blavia caliginosa Walker, 1862
Blavia scoteola (Hampson, 1900)

References

Lithosiini